Kartlos is the eponymous ancestor of the Georgians (Kartvelians) in Georgian mythology, more specifically of the nation of Kartli (Caucasian Iberia).
Kartlos is introduced in the medieval Georgian Chronicles (Kartlis Tskhovreba), presumably recorded from oral tradition by Leonti Mroveli in the 11th century.

The legend has it that he was the second son of Targamos and, thus, brother of Hayk, Movakos, Lekos, Heros, Kavkasos, and Egros from whom other Caucasian peoples took their origin. Kartlos united his people to become their chieftain and founded the city of Kartli. The oath by the grave of Kartlos was the most important and powerful in Kartli.

The sons of Kartlos are listed as: Mtskhetos, Gardabos, Kakhos, Kukhos, Gachios, Uphlos, Odzrkhos, Javakhos, the respective eponymous founders of Mtskheta, Gardabani, Kakheti, Kukheti, Gachiani, Uplistsikhe, Odzrkhe, and Javakheti.

The ancestors of Kartlos

References

Rapp, Stephen H. (2003), Studies In Medieval Georgian Historiography: Early Texts And Eurasian Contexts, p. 427. Peeters Bvba .

External links
TITUS text of the Kartlis Cxovreba

Georgian mythology
Japheth
Georgian words and phrases
Legendary progenitors